The Lowland Aborigine constituency is a multi-member constituency of the Legislative Yuan. Taiwanese indigenous people have elected representatives to reserved legislative seats since the 1970s. Predecessors to both the Lowland and Highland Aborigine districts were established in 1994. Since 2008 the Lowland Taiwanese indigenous elect three members to the Legislative Yuan. At its peak between 1998 and 2004, the constituency sent 4 members to the Legislative Yuan.

The district is dominated by the Amis ethnic group, with only one legislator (Chen Ying) ever elected from the Puyuma ethnic group.

Legislators

Election results

References 

2008 establishments in Taiwan
Constituencies in Taiwan
Taiwanese indigenous peoples